The 1974–75 Boston Celtics season was the 29th season of the Boston Celtics in the National Basketball Association (NBA). The Celtics entered the season hoping to repeat as NBA champions, but were unable to defend their title, falling in the Eastern Conference Finals to the Washington Bullets in 7 games. They did however, win their division for the fourth consecutive season.

The Boston Celtics were one of a handful of teams to play home games in four arenas.  Their main venue was Boston Garden, but three home games were played at the Hartford Civic Center, three at the Providence Civic Center and one at the Springfield Civic Center.

Draft picks

This table only displays picks through the second round.

Roster

Regular season

Season standings

Record vs. opponents

Playoffs

|- align="center" bgcolor="#ccffcc"
| 1
| April 14
| Houston
| W 123–106
| John Havlicek (30)
| Dave Cowens (19)
| John Havlicek (9)
| Boston Garden15,320
| 1–0
|- align="center" bgcolor="#ccffcc"
| 2
| April 16
| Houston
| W 112–100
| Dave Cowens (28)
| Dave Cowens (18)
| John Havlicek (7)
| Boston Garden13,254
| 2–0
|- align="center" bgcolor="#ffcccc"
| 3
| April 19
| @ Houston
| L 102–117
| Don Nelson (21)
| Havlicek, Silas (8)
| Silas, White (5)
| Hofheinz Pavilion10,218
| 2–1
|- align="center" bgcolor="#ccffcc"
| 4
| April 22
| @ Houston
| W 122–117
| Dave Cowens (31)
| —
| —
| Hofheinz Pavilion10,218
| 3–1
|- align="center" bgcolor="#ccffcc"
| 5
| April 24
| Houston
| W 128–115
| John Havlicek (28)
| Dave Cowens (12)
| John Havlicek (11)
| Boston Garden15,320
| 4–1
|-

|- align="center" bgcolor="#ffcccc"
| 1
| April 27
| Washington
| L 95–100
| Jo Jo White (27)
| Dave Cowens (19)
| Paul Silas (6)
| Boston Garden15,320
| 0–1
|- align="center" bgcolor="#ffcccc"
| 2
| April 30
| @ Washington
| L 92–117
| Don Nelson (23)
| Paul Silas (17)
| Jo Jo White (7)
| Capital Centre19,035
| 0–2
|- align="center" bgcolor="#ccffcc"
| 3
| May 3
| Washington
| W 101–90
| John Havlicek (26)
| Paul Silas (25)
| Jo Jo White (7)
| Boston Garden15,320
| 1–2
|- align="center" bgcolor="#ffcccc"
| 4
| May 7
| @ Washington
| L 108–119
| Jo Jo White (32)
| Dave Cowens (17)
| Jo Jo White (7)
| Capital Centre19,035
| 1–3
|- align="center" bgcolor="#ccffcc"
| 5
| May 9
| Washington
| W 103–99
| Dave Cowens (27)
| Dave Cowens (12)
| Don Chaney (5)
| Boston Garden15,320
| 2–3
|- align="center" bgcolor="#ffcccc"
| 6
| May 11
| @ Washington
| L 92–98
| Dave Cowens (23)
| Dave Cowens (21)
| Jo Jo White (6)
| Capital Centre19,035
| 2–4
|-

Awards and records
 John Havlicek, All-NBA Second Team
 Dave Cowens, All-NBA Second Team
 Jo Jo White, All-NBA Second Team
 John Havlicek, NBA All-Defensive First Team
 Paul Silas, NBA All-Defensive First Team
 Dave Cowens, NBA All-Defensive Second Team
 Don Chaney, NBA All-Defensive Second Team

References

Boston Celtics
Boston Celtics seasons
Boston Celtics
Boston Celtics
Celtics
Celtics